The ryfA RNA gene is a non-coding RNA present in E. coli, Shigella flexneri and Salmonella species where it is found between the ydaN and dbpA genes. These RNA genes are about 300 nucleotides in length. The function of this RNA is unknown.

References

External links 
 

Non-coding RNA